Maeota dichrura is a jumping spider species in the genus Maeota that lives in Brazil. It was first described by Eugène Simon in 1901.

References

Spiders described in 1901
Salticidae
Spiders of Brazil
Taxa named by Eugène Simon